The St Helens & District Football Combination was an English football league based in St Helens, Merseyside.

History 
The league was formed on 4 August 1917 when Ernest Worrall distributed notices to several of his friends & colleagues calling a meeting in the old LMS Club now known as The British Rail Club, Penlake Lane, Sutton. A league was formed but was initially known as The St Helens & District Junior Football League. The officers were Harry Thompson (Chairman), John Marsh (President) & Ernest Worrall (Gen Secretary).

The League Championship Cup dates back to the year 1917 but in 1919, Mr John Martin, a town centre hairdresser, presented the “Martin Cup” to the league. This Cup competition became immediately very popular especially in the 1930-1940 period when crowd numbers reached 3000-4000.

In 1921, a restructure of the divisions resulted in the division 1 clubs being formed into the St Helens “Senior” league and a further amalgamation saw Div1 and Div2 clubs having sections A & B thus forming the combination of sections. At the end of the 1921/22 season following a special meeting it was decided to run the league similar to that of the neighbouring Lancashire Alliance thus the St Helens and & District Junior League now became The St Helens & District Football Combination to commence in "March 1923”. Running parallel with the Combination in the late 1920s and throughout the 1930s and early 1940s was the Sunday School League in which the majority of the church clubs took part.

Clubs in the Sunday School League played for the Hewitt Cup (origin unknown) and players received a silver and enamel medal.

When that league finished clubs like Holy Cross and Holy Trinity eventually joined the combination.

In 1926 the Hospitals Charity Cup was introduced and is now the Combinations main cup competition and played for in open tournament for all combination clubs. In 1926 the Rainford Potteries Company donated to the Rainford Potteries Cup which at present is at temporary retirement. The DH Griffiths & Tom Worrall cup (1933) is the present Divisional Cups played for to coincide into an end of season final.

In the 1930s the most popular cup venue was Peasley Cross Rec, but since the loss of the ground due to industrial building several well-known venues were used; e.g. British Rail, (Penlake Sutton), Beecham's (Sutton Road), Greenall Whitley (Alder Hey Road) and at each ground, the attendance was outstanding. Finally at the eventual loss of these grounds the Hospital Cup Final which had become the Combination's F.A. Cup was held at St Helens Town Hoghton Road, but sadly, as progress is inevitable the “Town Ground” is no longer available, but up to the present moment Prescot Cables have come to the rescue and the Hospital Cup Final at Valerie Park Prescot has now become a very popular venue.

Going back to the pre-war years many talented clubs have graced the local Pitches. Names Like, British Sidac, Greenalls FC, Haydock C&B Recs, Haydock Villa (who in 1937/38 won 5 Trophies), Derbyshire Hill Rovers, Holy Cross, Holy Trinity, Beechams and Pilkingtons to name but a few. Even during the war years, football still was organised by the Combination, but only with a struggle as it was dramatically short of clubs and players. League rules were annulled so a “Home Guard” section was formed to accommodate up to eight clubs at one spell, following the World War II things got back to normal. Alf Moran was a long serving Chairman with popular secretary Jock Craig, the President was Tom Gordon MBE. Other officials to the present day, as Ernie Worrall, the Combination founder said, the four stalwarts of any league were. President, Chairman, Secretary and Treasurer, many well-known local figures have filled these roles over the years namely Presidents: John Marsh, Hugh Collins, Harry Wimpenny, Tom Gordon, Gerald Seddon and Latterly Bert Rawsthorne. Chairmen have included Harry Thompson, Arthur Fenton, Gus Atkins, Alf Moran, Gil Ryan, and the present incumbent Eric Bond. The job of Secretary, never easy, has been magnificently carried out by Ernie Worrall, Peter Smith, E Bradbury, R Williams, Ernie Baines, Jim Craig, David Watkins & the final secretary Robert Deakin. Treasurers have included W Leyland, Roddie Winstanley, Harry Wimpenny, John May, Jim Craig, J Dutton, Gil Ryan, Derek Roughley and the last man in office Derek Cleveland.

Final Seasons 

The Combination which comprised 15 clubs at end went from strength to strength since its formation, well over three quarters of a century ago to eventually decline, folding in 2016 due to lack of teams. It helped hundreds of young, and not so young footballers to get their feet on the ladders to success and is a perfect example of the well-known phrase:
“GRASS ROOTS FOOTBALL.”

Its clubs have won Liverpool County FA & Lancashire County FA Cup Competitions. Its Youth and Open Age Inter League sides, have lifted Liverpool County FA & Lancashire County FA Trophies and a number of players have gone on to tread the holy grounds of the football league and in some cases the world.

During the 2010–2011 season, Division Two club Mere recorded an unbeaten campaign, in their debut season in the St Helens Combination. After playing twenty games, their record was nineteen wins, one draw and no losses, scoring exactly one hundred goals in the process. An achievement never attained by any other club in the history of the league.

Knowsley South were treble winners in the 2010–2011 season.

Winners of the Premier Division for 2015–2016 were New Street Reserves.

Winners of Division One for 2015–2016 were Cheshire Lines Reserves.

When the league folded some clubs transferred to the Warrington & District Football League.

Famous past players 

Sammy Lynn, Bert Redwood, Bill Foulkes, Tommy O’Neil (Manchester United), Derek Hennin (Bolton Wanderers), Ray Ranson, Gary Owen (Manchester City), John Connelly (Burnley and Manchester United), Eric Moore (Everton), Bill Pilling, Alan A’Court (Liverpool), Geoff Nulty (Everton & Newcastle United), Mick Davock, Jim (Packy) Morris (Stockport County), John Quinn (Sheffield Wednesday), Mark Harris (Wrexham) and Jay Parker (Chelsea 'B').

Clubs

Premier Division
 Boilermakers Arms
 Clock Face Miners
 New Street Reserves
 Old Mill
 Parr Conservative
 Prescot Sun Inn
 Tanner Athletic
 West Park

First Division
 Bold Rangers
 Cheshire Lines Reserves
 Ecclesfield FC
 Manor Athletic
 Rockware
 Sutton Junction
 West Park Reserves

References 
 Official Site

 
Football Combination
Football leagues in England
Sports leagues established in 1917
1917 establishments in England